Temporary blindness, a type of non-permanent vision loss, may refer to:
Amaurosis fugax, or fleeting blindness
Conversion disorder, formerly called hysterical blindness
Flash blindness, caused by exposure to high-intensity light.

See also
Blindness (disambiguation)